The Meandrinidae are a family of stony corals. The name comes from the Greek, maiandros meaning "meandering", referring to the miniature, winding valleys found between the corallites. Fossil corals in this family have been found dating back to the Cretaceous.

Description
The Meandrinidae are colonial corals and form part of the reef- building community. They contain zooxanthellae, microscopic algae symbionts that provide them with energy. They occur in various different shapes, including massive, encrusting, columnar, and phaceloid (with tubular corallites united at the base). Although superficially resembling members of the family Faviidae, the corallites of meandrinids have solid, nonporous walls and evenly spaced, solid septa. Most of the genera are found only in the Atlantic Ocean, but Ctenella is endemic to the Red Sea and parts of the Indian Ocean.

Genera
The World Register of Marine Species includes these genera in the family:
Dendrogyra
Dichocoenia
Eusmilia
Meandrina Lamarck, 1801

References

 
Scleractinia
Cnidarian families